The Men of Sybill (German: Die Männer der Sybill) is a 1923 German silent drama film directed by Frederic Zelnik and starring Lya Mara, Carl Auen and Rudolf Forster. It was screened at the Marmorhaus in Berlin.

The film's sets were designed by the art director Fritz Lederer.

Cast
In alphabetical order
Carl Auen
Rudolf Forster
Fritz Lederer
Lya Mara
Albert Patry
Harald Paulsen
Frida Richard
Johannes Riemann
Käte Tann

References

External links

Films of the Weimar Republic
German silent feature films
Films directed by Frederic Zelnik
German black-and-white films
German drama films
1923 drama films
Silent drama films
1920s German films